The 1988 All-Ireland Junior Hurling Championship was the 58th staging of the All-Ireland Junior Championship, the Gaelic Athletic Association's second tier Gaelic football championship.

Cork were the defending champions, however, they were beaten by Meath in the All-Ireland home final.

The All-Ireland final was played on 9 October 1988 at Croke Park in Dublin, between Meath and London, in what was their fourth meeting in the final and a first in 26 years. Meath won the match by 1-10 to 0-03 to claim their fourth championship title overall and a first title since 1962.

Results

All-Ireland Junior Football Championship

All-Ireland home final

All-Ireland final

Championship statistics

Miscellaneous

 The All-Ireland final was played as a curtain raiser to the All-Ireland SFC final replay between Meath and Cork.

References

Junior
All-Ireland Junior Football Championship